Pelasgus minutus is a species of ray-finned fish in the family Cyprinidae.
It is found in Albania and North Macedonia.  Its natural habitats are rivers, intermittent rivers, and freshwater lakes.
It is threatened by habitat loss.

References

Pelasgus (fish)
Cyprinid fish of Europe
Fish described in 1924
Taxa named by Stanko Karaman
Taxonomy articles created by Polbot